Magic Boy, known in Japan as , is a 1959 Japanese animated feature film released on December 25, 1959. Released as Toei Animation's second theatrical anime, the film was released in theaters in the United States by Metro-Goldwyn-Mayer on June 22, 1961, making it the first anime film to be released in the country, followed by The Tale of the White Serpent on July 8, 1961.

Story
In medieval Japan, a boy named Sasuke and his sister live in a forest along with several young animals of different species. One day, one of the animals (a young deer) is grabbed by an eagle and thrown into a lake. Sasuke and another animal jump into the lake to save it, but a monstrous salamander arrives and devours one of the animals. Sasuke tries to fight the monster, but is defeated. The beast leaves the lake, revealing its true form: a female demon named Yakusha. Sasuke's sister tells him Yakusha was transformed into a salamander by a powerful wizard millennia ago, but now she can muster enough power to have her normal shape back and found a reign of terror in Japan. Sasuke then decides to seek a magician master to learn to fight against Yakusha to save Japan and avenge the death of his pet.

Cast and characters

The MGM version 

In the English language version, Metro-Goldwyn-Mayer left most of the original songs with Japanese language lyrics. Since the creators of the English version preferred to liken Sasuke to the public perception of samurai, who were viewed as heroic, as opposed to the ninja, who were viewed as "sinister spies and assassins," MGM's publicity incorrectly claimed that The Adventures of the Little Samurai was the Japanese title of the film. This despite the movie poster's accurate display of the actual title.

Video game 
A video game titled Shōnen Sarutobi Sasuke (also known as Sasuke Ninja Boy) was released by Sunsoft for the Super Famicom in 1994.

Reception 
According to animation historian Jerry Beck, the film exhibited Toei Animation's effort to use the "Disney formula of presenting a traditional folktale with songs and plenty of cute animals."

Home media 
Much like another MGM film, Night of the Lepus, the film never had a VHS release from MGM. Eventually in 2014, Warner Home Video released the MGM dub of the film on DVD for the first time as a Warner Archive title.

See also
Manga Sarutobi Sasuke

References

External links
 Official Web site 
 
 
 

1959 anime films
Adventure anime and manga
Films based on Japanese myths and legends
Ninja in anime and manga
Samurai in anime and manga
Toei Animation films
Metro-Goldwyn-Mayer animated films
1959 films
Japanese animated fantasy films
Japanese fantasy adventure films
1950s American films

ja:猿飛佐助#登場する作品